Březina is a municipality and village in Rokycany District in the Plzeň Region of the Czech Republic. It has about 400 inhabitants.

Geography
It lies in the Křivoklát Highlands. The Klabava River flows through the municipality. The Korečný Stream springs in Březina and flows across the municipal territory.

History
There was an ancient Slavic gord on Hradiště Hill. It was one of the oldest gords in the region.

The first written mention of Březina is from 1379. From 1379 to 1651, Březina was the centre of an estate, administered from the Březina Castle. It was owned by various noble families and ofter changed hands. During the Thirty Years' War, the castle was devastated, and in 1661, it was described as abandoned.

From 1682 to 1758, Březina was property of the Bubna of Litice family. In 1758, it was acquired by the Sternberg family, who were its most notable owners. In the early 19th century, they had built here a new castle. Kaspar Maria von Sternberg established a large castle park with rare species, although many of them were destroyed by frost in 1929.

Demographics

Sights

Neo-Gothic reconstruction of the ruin of the original Březina Castle was made in the 19th century, and the castle became known as Salon. It is a landmark of Březina located on a hill above the village.

The new Březina Castle from the 19th century is still owned by the Sternbergs and is not accessible to the public.

Notable people
Kaspar Maria von Sternberg (1761–1838), nobleman and scientist; died here
Vlasta Burian (1891–1962), actor; used to spend vacations on his cottage in Březina

References

External links

Villages in Rokycany District
Sternberg family